Herb Henderson may refer to:
 Herb Henderson (Australian footballer)
 Herb Henderson (American football)
 Herb H. Henderson, American attorney and civil rights activist

See also
 Herbert Henderson (disambiguation)